Diboli is a small town and principal settlement of the commune of Falémé in the Cercle of Kayes in the Kayes Region of south-western Mali. It is located just  from the Mali–Senegal border. Its nearest big town is Kidira, across the border in Senegal.

References

Populated places in Kayes Region